Frank Lomani (born 18 April 1996) is a Fijian rugby union player who plays for the Fijian Drua in the National Rugby Championship competition as well as the Fijian Latui in the Global Rapid Rugby competition. He also trained with the Super Rugby side Melbourne Rebels during the 2018 season. His position of choice is scrum-half. He signed a two-year contract with the Melbourne Rebels for the 2020-2021 seasons. In August 2021, it was announced that Lomani would be moving to the Northern Hemisphere to play for the Northampton Saints in the English Premiership.

Super Rugby statistics

References

External links 
 

Fijian rugby union players
1996 births
Living people
Rugby union scrum-halves
Fiji international rugby union players
Fijian expatriate rugby union players
Expatriate rugby union players in Australia
Rugby union wings
Melbourne Rebels players
Fijian Drua players
Barbarian F.C. players
Northampton Saints players